is a public senior high school in Dazaifu, Fukuoka Prefecture.

The school is a part of the prefectural school district six, and as of 2015 is the newest high school in it. The school has a focus on art and displays many pieces of art due to its proximity to the Kyushu National Museum. It is the sole high school in the prefecture which offers art courses. The school began classes in April 1985.

References

High schools in Fukuoka Prefecture
Education in Fukuoka Prefecture
1985 establishments in Japan
Educational institutions established in 1985